Eugene Stephen Jay (born January 26, 1951) is an American bassist, best known for working with "Weird Al" Yankovic.

Early life
Jay was born Eugene Stephen Jay in Detroit, Michigan on January 26, 1951. He auditioned for "Weird Al" Yankovic in 1982 after answering an ad in the newspaper, and the two have worked together ever since. Jay can be heard or seen on all of Yankovic's albums, videos, and concerts.

He is also the founder of the ethno-funk duo Ak & Zuie, with Pete Gallagher. He has scored more than fifty nationally broadcast PBS specials and series episodes, including three George Foster Peabody Award winners, and contributed to several feature films. He has also done extensive session work, released eight solo records on his own Ayarou label, and produced two albums for the WEA Nonesuch Explorer series.

Jay's background includes a BA and MM Graduate Fellowship in composition from the University of South Florida in 1972. After completing his studies, he went to Niger and spent two and half years studying drumming. Selections from his archival field recordings of traditional West African ceremonies, dances, and solo performances were made into three albums released by Warner/Nonesuch.

Discography

Nonesuch Explorer Series
 Ghana: Ancient Ceremonies, Songs, and Dance Music
 Dances of the World
 West Africa: Drum, Chant, and Instrumental Music

With "Weird Al" Yankovic
 "Weird Al" Yankovic
 "Weird Al" Yankovic In 3-D
 Dare to Be Stupid
 Polka Party!
 Even Worse
 UHF - Original Motion Picture Soundtrack and Other Stuff
 Off the Deep End
 Alapalooza
 Bad Hair Day
 Running with Scissors
 Poodle Hat
 Straight Outta Lynwood
 Alpocalypse
 Mandatory Fun

Solo albums
 Sea Never Dry – 1997
 Film Music – 1998 – a collection of 66 short excerpts from his original film and television scores
 Tangled Strings – 1999
 Self Avoiding Random Walk – 2000
 Outer Voice – 2004
 Rounder Gaze – 2004
 Friction – 2004
 Plus – 2004
 Physical Answer – 2008
 Chaos, Clouds and Tongue – 2011
 Things Change – 2013
 El Natural 7 – 2016
 Spontaneous Symmetry – 2016
 When One Remains – 2016
 So Do I Sadie – 2018
 Vita Beata – 2022

With Ak & Zuie
 Non-Franciscan Duets

Compilations
 Deep Forest
 Late in the 20th Century: An Elektra / Nonesuch New Music Sampler

References

External links
 
 Uncharted Territory from Global Bass Magazine, December 2001
 Stephen Jay, Bass Player for Weird Al Yankovic, On Playing Live Through Mackie SR1530s from Bass Player Magazine, May 11, 2005

1951 births
American bass guitarists
Guitarists from Detroit
Living people
University of South Florida alumni
"Weird Al" Yankovic
20th-century American guitarists